The 124th Brigade was a formation of  the British Army during the First World War. It was raised as part of the new army also known as Kitchener's Army and assigned to the 41st Division.

Formation
The infantry battalions did not all serve at once, but all were assigned to the brigade during the war.
10th Battalion, Queen's Royal Regiment (West Surrey) 	 
26th Battalion, Royal Fusiliers 	 
32nd Battalion, Royal Fusiliers 
21st Battalion, King's Royal Rifle Corps (Yeomen Rifles)
124th Machine Gun Company 	
124th Trench Mortar Battery
20th Battalion, Durham Light Infantry

References

Infantry brigades of the British Army in World War I